Revolver: Special Edition is an expanded reissue of the 1966 album Revolver by the English rock band the Beatles. It was released on 28 October 2022, and includes a new stereo remix of the album by Giles Martin, with the help of de-mixing technology developed by Peter Jackson's WingNut Films, as well as the original mono mix, session recordings, demos, and an EP including new mixes of the non-album single "Paperback Writer" and its B-side, "Rain", recorded during the Revolver sessions.

Background 
Giles Martin had previously expressed interest in remixing the Beatles' pre-Sgt. Pepper albums via special "demixing" technology developed at Abbey Road Studios, but wanted to wait until the software improved enough to be used in such a project. Speaking to Rolling Stone in July 2021, Martin said that the software was "getting a lot better" and that he was "constantly looking at how we could approach it if I ever get to [remix] Revolver or Rubber Soul, early albums, which a lot of people want me to do". In October 2021, Martin told Super Deluxe Edition: "I don't think it's ready at this moment in time", but noted about Revolver: "There's not as much bouncing down on Revolver as there is on Pepper. There's not that many instruments, it's not that complex."

In late August 2022, Martin confirmed via Twitter that Revolver would receive a remix, with a further tweet hinting at an additional surround sound mix. The reissue was officially announced on 7 September 2022. Martin confirmed that the "demixing" technology had improved considerably by that point, and credited the work done by Peter Jackson's audio team in the development of The Beatles: Get Back for making the new remix possible. To promote the reissue, the new mix for the album's opening track, "Taxman", was released as a preview.

Content 
The remixed and expanded edition of Revolver was released on 28 October 2022. The editions include a five-CD or four-LP/one 7-inch-EP super deluxe set, containing the half-speed remastered original album in both stereo and mono, demos and sessions, the EP, and a 100-page book; a deluxe edition, featuring an abridged 40-page book, the new stereo mix, session highlights, and stereo mixes of the singles; and standard digital, CD, and vinyl releases. Following the announcement of these editions in September, a preview of the 2022 mix of "Taxman" was released on Spotify and iTunes.

The 100-page book features a foreword by Paul McCartney; an introduction by Giles Martin; an essay by Questlove; and track notes by author Kevin Howlett. The book is illustrated with images of handwritten lyrics, tape boxes, and recording sheets, as well as 1966 print ads and extracts from the graphic novel, Revolver 50. Birth of an Icon, written and illustrated by Klaus Voormann.

Along with the restoration of the original album artwork by Voormann, the record sleeve that holds the session outtakes features Robert Freeman's proposed cover design, featuring the heads of the Beatles in a psychedelic circle.

Reception 
On Metacritic, Revolver: Special Edition holds an aggregate score of 100 out of 100, based on nine reviews, indicating "universal acclaim".

Annie Zaleski of The Guardian gave the album five out of five stars, writing: "Revolvers new details tease out deeper meanings in the songs. Now more prominent, the low-lit backing harmonies on 'Here, There and Everywhere' remake the tune as an old-fashioned rock'n'roll love song; the piano bending out of key on 'I Want to Tell You' mirrors the narrator's insecurity; and McCartney's booming walking bass on 'Taxman' illuminates the biting, cynical tone of Harrison's lyrics... Revolver still sounds so vibrant."

Track listings 
All tracks written by Lennon–McCartney, except for tracks with asterisks, which are by George Harrison.

Revolver (2022 stereo remix)

Special Edition bonus tracks 
CD 2: Sessions
"Tomorrow Never Knows" (Take 1)3:32
"Tomorrow Never Knows" (Mono mix RM 11)3:05
"Got To Get You Into My Life" (First version) – Take 54:10
"Got To Get You Into My Life" (Second version) – Unnumbered mix – mono2:36
"Got To Get You Into My Life" (Second version) – Take 82:48
"Love You To"* (Take 1) – mono2:40
"Love You To"* (Unnumbered rehearsal) – mono1:35
"Love You To"* (Take 7)2:55
"Paperback Writer" (Takes 1 and 2) – Backing track – mono3:38
"Rain" (Take 5 – Actual speed)2:38
"Rain" (Take 5 – Slowed down for master tape)3:12
"Doctor Robert" (Take 7)2:59
"And Your Bird Can Sing" (First version) – Take 22:14
"And Your Bird Can Sing" (First version) – Take 2 (giggling)2:23

CD 3: Sessions
"And Your Bird Can Sing" (Second version) – Take 52:20
"Taxman"* (Take 11)2:37
"I'm Only Sleeping" (Rehearsal fragment) – mono0:48
"I'm Only Sleeping" (Take 2) – mono2:28
"I'm Only Sleeping" (Take 5) – mono2:43
"I'm Only Sleeping" (Mono mix RM1)3:07
"Eleanor Rigby" (Speech before Take 2)2:11
"Eleanor Rigby" (Take 2)2:20
"For No One" (Take 10) – Backing track2:23
"Yellow Submarine" (Songwriting work tape – Part 1) – mono1:04
"Yellow Submarine" (Songwriting work tape – Part 2) – mono4:42
"Yellow Submarine" (Take 4 before sound effects)2:37
"Yellow Submarine" (Highlighted sound effects)3:03
"I Want To Tell You"* (Speech and Take 4)1:24
"Here, There And Everywhere" (Take 6)2:29
"She Said She Said" (John's demo) – mono1:10
"She Said She Said" (Take 15) – Backing track rehearsal3:24

CD 4: Original mono mix
"Taxman"*2:36
"Eleanor Rigby"2:11
"I'm Only Sleeping"2:58
"Love You To"*3:09
"Here, There and Everywhere"2:29
"Yellow Submarine"2:40
"She Said She Said"2:39
"Good Day Sunshine"2:08
"And Your Bird Can Sing"2:02
"For No One"2:03
"Doctor Robert"2:14
"I Want to Tell You"*2:30
"Got to Get You into My Life"2:35
"Tomorrow Never Knows"3:00

CD 5: EP
"Paperback Writer" (New stereo mix)2:16
"Rain" (New stereo mix)3:01
"Paperback Writer" (Original mono mix remastered)2:23
"Rain" (Original mono mix remastered)3:01

Personnel 

 Giles Martin – production and mixing
 Sam Okell – engineering and mixing
 Miles Showell – mastering (2022 stereo mixes, single EP)
 Alex Wharton – mastering (Sessions)
 Sean Magee – mastering (2022 mono vinyl remaster)
 Thomas Hall – mastering (2022 mono CD remaster)
 Emile de la Rey – head of machine learning
 Matthew Cocker – engineering (archive tape transfer, Sessions demonstration mixes)
 Kevin Howlett – liner notes, archive tape research, editing
 Mike Heatley – archive tape research, editing
 Darren Evans – art director
 Aaron Bremner – photo editing and research
 Dorcas Lynn – photo editing and research
 Steve Tribe – copy editor

Charts

Notes

References

Sources

External links
Announcement of Revolver Special Editions, at the Beatles' official website

2022 compilation albums
The Beatles compilation albums
Albums produced by George Martin
Reissue albums